Intellectual curiosity (also called epistemic curiosity) is curiosity that leads to an acquisition of general knowledge. It can include curiosity about such things as what objects are composed of, the underlying mechanisms of systems, mathematical relationships, languages, social norms, and history. It can be differentiated from another type of curiosity that does not lead to the acquisition of general knowledge, such as curiosity about the intimate secrets of other people. It is a facet of openness to experience in the Five Factor Model used to describe human personalities. It is similar to need for cognition and typical intellectual engagement.

History
In antiquity,  the Roman philosopher Cicero wrote about humans' innate love of learning:

In 1738, the Scottish philosopher David Hume differentiated intellectual curiosity from a more primitive form of curiosity: 
Later, in 1954, Berlyne differentiated it into perceptual curiosity and epistemic curiosity, and in 2004 a psychometric scale to assess epistemic and perceptual curiosity was developed.

Intellectual development in children
Humans seem to be born with intellectual curiosity, but depending on how parents react to questions from their children, intellectual curiosity might be increased or decreased. Parents that always react negatively to questions asked by their children, are discouraging them from asking questions, and that is likely to make them less curious. On the other hand, parents that always react positively to questions asked by their children, are encouraging them to ask questions, and that is likely to make them more curious.

Academic performance
Intellectual curiosity has been positively correlated with academic performance (0.20), together with general intelligence (0.35) and conscientiousness (0.20).

Scientific progress
Toby E. Huff has argued that the European civilization had a high level of intellectual curiosity during the scientific revolution. He also argues that other civilizations have had a high level of intellectual curiosity in their most progressive stages.

Neurobiological basis
The temporal lobe is involved in understanding. Intellectual curiosity might be regarded as the trait that motivates growth of understanding in the temporal lobe. Motivation is effectuated by the neurotransmitter dopamine

Similarity to other concepts
Due to a high level of correlation (.78), it has been argued that need for cognition and typical intellectual engagement basically are measuring the same trait. Intellectual curiosity might be regarded as an umbrella term for these two traits.

References 

Cognitive science